Gay-for-pay describes male or female actors, pornographic stars, or sex workers who identify as heterosexual but who are paid to act or perform as homosexual professionally. The term has also applied to other professions and even companies trying to appeal to a gay demographic. The stigma of being gay or labeled as such has steadily eroded since the Stonewall riots began the modern American gay rights movement in 1969. Through the 1990s, mainstream movie and television actors have been more willing to portray homosexuality, as the threat of any backlash against their careers has lessened and society's acceptance of gay and lesbian people has increased.

In the gay pornography industry, that uses amateurs as well as professional actors, the term gay-for-pay refers to actors who identify as straight but who engage in same-sex sexual activities for money or sexual gain. Some actors who are actually gay or bisexual will be marketed as straight to appeal to the "allure of the unattainable," because straight men (or those newly coming out) are virgins to sex with other men; scholar Camille Paglia declared that "Seduction of straight studs is a highly erotic motif in gay porn"

Pornography
Because some gay men consider heterosexual men to be objects of fantasy, some gay porn producers have almost certainly described some actors as heterosexual to increase sales and publicity for their product. Moreover, many gay or bisexual men who star in gay porn films may wish to be identified publicly as heterosexual for personal or professional reasons.

Some straight actors have started acting in gay porn only to be accused of being gay while others' first step was to strictly do solo masturbation or muscle exhibition scenes. The higher pay scale and profile within a production often leads to group scenes where a straight actor only "tops." A "top" actor will often be sought as a bottom and the debut is often treated as a notable event or even its own release.

Sex workers

In the sex worker industry, the term may also be applied to straight people of either gender (including "male escorts") who have sexual contact or scenes with a client or another sex worker of the same gender.  Although sexual contact is often involved, sex scenes or solo scenes (like masturbating to climax) or even a BDSM scene for the client's stimulation can take place.  Sexual arousal without direct sexual contact may also occur in such niche trade as muscle worship. As in porn work, a gay identity is not necessary to make money from gay clients and consumers.

Go-go dancers
Go-go dancing originated in the 1960s. It was eventually appropriated by burlesque and striptease establishments, which became known as "go-go bars". Many gay clubs had male go-go dancers, called go-go boys during the period 1965–1968.  After that, few gay clubs had go-go dancers until a resurgence in the late 1980s, when go-go dancing again became fashionable, and has remained so ever since. 

"Go-go dancers" that perform at night clubs, special parties, circuit parties or rave dances in colorful bright costumes, which may include battery operated lights, with fire sticks, or with a snake can also be called performance art dancers or box dancers. Large circuit parties and gay clubs often have very attractive go-go boys of all sexualities who will allow patrons to touch and rub them but only for tips. This is typical in Thai venues, such as in Sunee Plaza, Pattaya. Some criticize the practice of employing straight dancers to perform erotically for gay audiences when gay performers are available.

Film and television

In film and television, the term "pinkface" is the use of straight actors to play LGB roles or characters. Anna King of Time Out likens "pinkface" to blackface. Pinkface differs from straightwashing, the erasing of gay characters and themes in film and TV stories.

The gay community has expressed concerns about the use of straight actors to play gay characters, a practice that has also been nicknamed "gay for pay" in the acting industry. This occurs in films and shows such as Call Me By Your Name (straight actors Armie Hammer and Timothée Chalamet), Brokeback Mountain (Heath Ledger and Jake Gyllenhaal), Modern Family (starring Eric Stonestreet), Brooklyn Nine-Nine (starring Andre Braugher), Will & Grace (starring Eric McCormack),  Philadelphia (starring Tom Hanks), Capote (starring Philip Seymour Hoffman) and Milk (with Sean Penn playing the role of the real-life gay rights activist-political leader Harvey Milk). 

Controversy has arisen from this practice due to nominations and wins of awards from these roles. For example, since Hanks' win for Philadelphia in 1993, only two openly gay actors have been nominated for either Best Actor or Best Supporting Actor at the Academy Awards: Nigel Hawthorne in 1994, and Ian McKellen in 1998 and 2001. Neither man won, nor has an openly gay man been nominated since. Meanwhile, fifteen straight actors have been nominated for gay roles, with four winning.

The LGB community has also raised concerns about when actors in pinkface have used negative or harmful stereotypes in their portrayals of gay characters. Dennis Lim states that the depictions of gays in mainstream film typically include the "gay joke", in which LGB people are depicted to create humor; depicting gay men pejoratively as a "daisy, a fairy, a nonce, a pansy, a swish" or showing lesbian woman as "butch"; and to create a homosexual panic that plays on heterosexual people's fears of experiencing sexual advances from LGB people.

The 1980 film Cruising created controversy due to its plot of a straight cop, played by straight actor Al Pacino, going undercover to infiltrate a gay nightclub, and its negative depictions of gay men that seem to justify a gay panic defense from Pacino's character. Straight actor Sacha Baron Cohen's portrayal of a gay man in the film Brüno also created controversy, being described as an attempt to "...mak[e] fun of the queer community."

Pinkface in television advertising has also been compared to blackface; similar to the way 19th-century blackface performances created and affirmed a hierarchical system that presented certain identities as "preferred and privileged", with pinkface ads, LGBT people are portrayed to create "humorous stigmatization" which is "insidious," as "like blackface, pinkface advertisements create a culture that posits the identities of GLBT persons [to a mainly non-GLBT audience] as inferior, inappropriate and ludicrous." One source called pinkface ads the "most destructive genre of queer commercials," as they manipulate queer identities to create stigmatization at gay people's expense and strengthen heteronormative standards.

Some pinkface TV ads depict hairy bearded men in drag (wearing dresses), with the intent of making fun of and devaluing trans women and present a "campy, stigmatized" depiction of trans people. Bud Light's 2003 beer commercial "Clown" depicts gay men as perverse by showing a man in a clown costume who appears to be walking on his hands, so that his mouth is positioned at the location of his costume's "bottom," thus making his drinking of beer look like the bottle is going into his anus, as the "bar patrons look at...in disgust," showing that the gay reference is derogatory. 

In the 2007 Snickers chocolate bar ad "Chest hair," two men eat the same chocolate bar and then accidentally end up kissing when they eat the entire bar, causing them to scream and rip out their chest hair, which implies that if two men kiss, they must prove their masculinity with pain-causing "hypermasculine behavior," which implies it is "preferable to physically harm one's self than to be identified as gay."

Gary Nunn of The Guardian, noting that he grew up as a closeted and confused boy, said that while he understands gay people wanting to "redress the balance" of "gay actors hav[ing] been told by Hollywood to stay in the closet if they ever want to play a straight role" and straight white men having more power and influence and access to better jobs than other people, "to demand that only gay actors play gay roles is not the way to correct an inequality." He believes that "in a world where gay actors are still denied straight roles, it'll just lead to typecasting of gay actors - the very thing they're wanting to escape. Gay actors want a diversity of roles just like straight actors do."

Popular culture
 The Fluffer, film about a fictional gay-for-pay actor
 The Real World: Las Vegas (2011) featured Dustin Zito, a former gay-for-pay actor

Straight-for-pay
A term that is derivative of "gay-for-pay" is the partly tongue-in-cheek term "straight-for-pay," which describes gay men who have sex with women for pay. The term was coined to describe the film Shifting Gears: A Bisexual Transmission, due to gay porn stars Cameron Marshall and Blake Riley being featured in heterosexual scenes. Other notable examples of gay porn stars going "straight-for-pay" are Steven Daigle and Arpad Miklos, the latter of whom received a great deal of criticism for his scene on the site Straight Guys for Gay Eyes (SG4GE). SG4GE's company principal Jake Cruise defended the scene, stating that it was a "winning idea" to portray a "masculine gay man exploring straight sex" because "I’ve always loved to push boundaries and press buttons with my work."

In August 2018, the gay male pornographic website Men.com released its first scene featuring MMF bisexual porn titled "The Challenge." Arad Winwin, the star of the scene and a self-identified gay man, faced backlash from fans for acting in the scene, with some fans accusing him of being straight or of having "converted" to heterosexual or bisexual. Winwin told the gay website Str8UpGayPorn that “I’m a gay man...This was only a job, and it was nothing more. Nothing personal. I was working, and it was like any other scene I’ve done.”

See also

 Dakota Cochrane
 Heteroflexibility
 Kazuhito Tadano
 Latent homosexuality
 Straightwashing

References

Pornography terminology
LGBT and society
Male prostitution
Gay male pornography
LGBT slang
Cultural appropriation
Sexual fluidity